Christiana Drummond Morgan (born Christiana Drummond Councilman; October 6, 1897 – March 14, 1967) was an American artist, writer and lay psychoanalyst at Harvard University best known for her work co-authoring the Thematic Apperception Test, one of the most widely used projective psychological tests. She was the lover of American psychologist Henry Murray, who commissioned Gaston Lachaise to make a nude portrait statue of her. Morgan was an alcoholic and died under unclear circumstances age 69.

Early life and education
Christiana was born Drummond Councilman in Boston, Massachusetts on October 6, 1897. She attended Miss Winsor's school for girls in Boston from 1908 to 1914 and later a boarding school in Farmington, Connecticut.
 
In 1917, as a 20 year old in Boston society she met William Otho Potwin Morgan (1895–1934). He enlisted to fight in World War I and went abroad. Morgan trained as nurse aid at the YWCA in New York City and served as a nurse during the 1918 flu pandemic. Upon his return in 1919 they married and moved into 985 Memorial Drive in Cambridge -the same building, in which a few years later, the British mathematician philosopher Alfred North Whitehead and his wife would live as well.  
From 1921 to 1924 Morgan studied art at the Art Students League of New York with Frank DuMond, Guy Pène du Bois, and Leo Lentelli.

Professional career 
Morgan was an artist, writer, and lay psychoanalyst fascinated by depth psychology. Part of the Introvert/Extrovert Club in New York City in the 1920s, she traveled to Zurich to consult Carl Jung. When Jung met Morgan, he considered her the manifestation of the perfect feminine, une femme inspiratrice whose role was to act as a muse to great men. Jung conducted a seminar, called the "Visions Seminar", analyzing Morgan's many drawings and dreams chronicling her archetypal encounters in her quest for psychological integration.

In a new Hebrew-language biography of Chaim Weizmann, Motti Golani and Jehuda Reinharz cite documents showing that in 1921 Christiana Morgan had a liaison with Weizmann.

In 1923, she met and fell in love with Henry Murray, then biochemist at Rockefeller University NY, later psychology professor at Harvard University. He was married 7 years, and did not want to leave his wife. As Murray experienced a serious conflict, Morgan advised him to visit Jung. In 1927, they visited Jung in Zürich, and upon his advice became lovers "to unlock their unconscious and their creativity".

In 1934, Morgan co-developed the Thematic Apperception Test with Murray, a projective psychological test to elicit fantasy still used today. It consists of a series of pictures shown to a person who is asked to make up a story about each picture; in its early development, many of Morgan's own drawings were included. She was first author with Henry Murray in the first publication of the test, and as late as 1941 the test was known as the "Morgan-Murray Thematic Apperception Test" . When the current version of the test was published by the Harvard University Press in 1943, authorship was attributed to "Henry A. Murray, M.D., and the Staff of the Harvard Psychological Clinic." As it was further developed, Morgan's pictures were taken out as well as her co-authorship. Murray stated 1985, "Morgan asked to have her name removed as senior author of the 1943/1971 TAT because she disliked the obligation of making the academic responses".

Morgan administered one of the earliest versions of the test to one of the first diagnosed anorexic patients in Boston.

Death 
After a radical sympathectomy surgery for high blood pressure and years of excessive drinking, Morgan died at the age of 69 at Denis Bay, Saint John, U.S. Virgin Islands on March 14, 1967. Murray found her body near the beach, drowned in less than two feet of water. There is controversy over her death related to Murray's conflicting accounts, and suspicions that Morgan may have died of suicide.

Legacy
The Thematic Apperception Test is one of the most widely used projective psychological tests to date.

Murray had commissioned Gaston Lachaise to create a nude portrait statue of Morgan. It is now owned by the Governor's Academy, in Byfield, Massachusetts as is Morgan Tower, formerly her residence on the Parker River adjacent to the Governor's campus.

References 

 Douglas, C. (1993) Translate This Darkness: The Life of Christiana Morgan the Veiled Woman in Jung's Circle Princeton, NJ: Princeton University Press.
 Robinson, F. G. (1992) Love's Story Told: A Life of Henry A. Murray, Harvard University Press.

External links 

 Christiana Morgan papers, 1925-1974. H MS c70. Harvard Medical Library, Francis A. Countway Library of Medicine, Boston, Mass.

20th-century American psychologists
American women psychologists
American psychotherapists
Harvard University people
People from Boston
Suicides in the United States Virgin Islands
1897 births
1967 suicides
Suicides by drowning in the United States
20th-century American women
1967 deaths
20th-century American people